The People's Socialist Party (PSP) was a Spanish political party.

History

Origins
The origins of the party dated back to 1954 when the University professor, Enrique Tierno Galván published various academic studies of a Marxist character. In 1965, working together with Raúl Morodo, he formed the Castillian Socialist Federation (Federación Socialista Castellana). Two years later, the party became the 'Partido Socialista del Interior' or the Socialist Party of the Interior, reflecting the fact that most of its members were based in Spain in contrast to the Spanish Socialist Workers' Party (PSOE), many of whose members were exiles. The party attempted to reach agreements with the PSOE, but ideological differences proved insurmountable.

In Francoist Spain it was an illegal underground movement on University Campuses, and it adopted the Popular Socialist Party name in 1974. Its President was Tierno Galván. That same year the party formed the Spanish Democratic Junta (Junta Democrática de España) together with the Communist Party of Spain (PCE) and Carlist Party.

It defined itself as socialist and Marxist  and in contrast to the PSOE, which had a base in the trade union movement, many PSP members were University Professors and intellectuals.

Legalization and elections
The PSP stood in the Spanish general election, 1977 in coalition with a number of regional left wing movements especially the Socialist Party of Andalusia (where they stood under the name 'Socialist Unity'). Overall the PSP won 816,582 votes (4.46%) and 6 deputies.

Integration in the PSOE
In February 1978 the party began entering into discussions with other parties such as the Communist Party of Spain and the PSOE about possible future electoral cooperation. Although Tierno denied suggestions of mergers during those discussions, the party congress voted in favour of a merger with the PSOE on 1 April 1978 and this was concluded at a joint press conference between Tierno and Felipe Gonzalez, the PSOE leader in April 1978. and the following year Tierno Galván was elected Mayor of Madrid by the PSOE and PCE.

References

External links
Images
PSP logo
PSP poster

1968 establishments in Spain
1978 disestablishments in Spain
Anti-Francoism
Defunct socialist parties in Spain
Formerly banned political parties in Spain
Formerly banned socialist parties
Political parties disestablished in 1978
Political parties established in 1968
Socialist International
Spanish Socialist Workers' Party